Rock Band Track Packs (called Song Packs in Europe and Australia) are a series of supplemental media discs for the Rock Band series of music video games. The packs are developed by Harmonix and Demiurge Studios (earlier packs were developed with Pi Studios), and distributed by MTV Games and Electronic Arts. The track packs are fully functional standalone games and do not require separate Rock Band titles to play; however, on consoles that support downloadable content, the songs from these packs can be integrated with other Rock Band titles.

Rock Band Track Pack Vol. 1

Rock Band Track Pack Vol. 1 (Rock Band Song Pack 1) was released for the Wii and PlayStation 2 on July 15, 2008. The addition was announced on May 5, 2008. This disc contains 20 songs previously released as downloadable content for the PlayStation 3 and Xbox 360 . As there are only 20 songs, all tracks have been re-arranged into "Stages" instead of Tiers, with four "Stages" in total. The following songs are featured on this track pack:

AC/DC Live: Rock Band Track Pack

AC/DC Live: Rock Band Track Pack (AC/DC Live: Rock Band) was announced on September 29, 2008, and was released for the PlayStation 2, PlayStation 3, and Xbox 360 on November 2. The Wii version was released on November 16, 2008. The pack contains all 18 tracks from AC/DC's Live at Donington DVD. The game, through pre-existing licensing deals that AC/DC has with the retail chains, was only available at Wal-Mart and Sam's Club. This exclusivity agreement was only applicable in the United States, and ended on November 4, 2009 when GameStop began selling new copies of the game for $20. Each copy of the track pack includes a code that can be redeemed online to allow Xbox 360 and PlayStation 3 owners to download the content to their console for use in other Rock Band titles. The game can also be played as a standalone title, including a number of Achievements for Xbox 360 owners, but otherwise does not feature many of the gameplay elements of the full Rock Band titles, such as character creation or customization, online play, or a World Tour mode. The track pack retails for $30 for the PS2 version and $40 for other consoles.  Harmonix has confirmed that the songs will remain exclusive to the disc release, citing AC/DC's preference to sell their music as full albums instead of singles. They have not ruled out releasing the content in the future should the band's views change.

Rock Band Track Pack Vol. 2

Rock Band Track Pack Vol. 2 (Rock Band Song Pack 2) is an expansion disc for the Rock Band series featuring 20 master recordings previously released as downloadable content on the Xbox Live Marketplace and PlayStation Network Store. Unlike the first expansion, Vol. 2 is available on the Xbox 360 and PlayStation 3 as well as the Wii and PlayStation 2. Much like the AC/DC Live pack, the Xbox 360 and PlayStation 3 versions also include a code to download the songs to a hard drive for use in other Rock Band games.

The following songs are included on the game disc:

Rock Band Track Pack: Classic Rock

Rock Band Track Pack: Classic Rock is an expansion disc for the Rock Band series featuring 20 master recordings previously released as downloadable content on the Xbox Live Marketplace and PlayStation Network Store. The pack is available for Xbox 360, PlayStation 3, Wii, and PlayStation 2. The Xbox 360 and PlayStation 3 versions also include a code to export the songs to a hard drive for use in other Rock Band games. The Track Pack can also be played as a standalone game for all systems in the same manner as the AC/DC Live and Track Pack Vol. 2, and is also the first Rock Band Track Pack on Wii and on PS2 to be fully compatible with all Guitar Hero instruments.

The following songs are included on the disc:

Rock Band Country Track Pack

Harmonix released a fifth track pack for the Xbox 360, PlayStation 3, Wii, and PlayStation 2. The disc features 21 songs, and for the first time includes songs never before seen in the Rock Band series. These songs were exclusive to Rock Band Country Track Pack for a limited time before being released to the Rock Band Music Store by late 2009 and early 2010. The Xbox 360 and PlayStation 3 versions also include a code to export the songs to a hard drive for use in other Rock Band games. The Track Pack can also be played as a standalone game for all systems in the same manner as the AC/DC Track Pack and Track Pack Vol. 2.

The setlist includes the following songs:

Songs were first released to Rock Band through this disc.

Rock Band Metal Track Pack

Rock Band Metal Track Pack for the Wii, Xbox 360, PlayStation 2, and PlayStation 3 was released on September 22, 2009. The track pack contains 20 songs, featuring a mix of new songs as well as those previously released as downloadable content. The songs debuting in this track pack were made available through the Rock Band Music Store on January 26, 2010. As with previous track packs, Metal Track Pack allows users to download the songs off the disc for use in Rock Band and Rock Band 2. This was the last Rock Band game for the PlayStation 2.

The following songs are contained on the disc:

Songs were first available via this Track Pack.

Rock Band Country Track Pack 2

Rock Band Country Track Pack 2 contains 21 tracks, and was released for Xbox 360, PlayStation 3, and Wii on February 1, 2011. All songs on the disc were exclusive to the Track Pack before being released as downloadable content on November 8, 2011. The retail disc export is compatible with Rock Band, Rock Band 2, and Rock Band 3 while the standalone DLC is only compatible with Rock Band 3. Both the retail disc export and standalone "RB3 Versions" feature Pro Drum tracks and Harmony Vocals where appropriate while the "RB3 Versions" additionally have Keyboard and Pro Keyboard tracks added where appropriate. A Pro Guitar upgrade is available for the "RB3 Version" of "Ride" by Trace Adkins. The "RB3 version" versions of this entire track pack are available as a bundle download in the online Rock Band store, under the name "Country Mega Pack."

The setlist includes the following songs:

External links
 Official Rock Band series song list

References

Rock Band series
Track Pack
PlayStation 2 games
PlayStation 3 games
Xbox 360 games
Wii games
Rock Band Country Track Pack 2
Lists of video games by franchise